Killala is a village in County Mayo in Ireland, north of Ballina. The railway line from Dublin to Ballina once extended to Killala. To the west of Killala is a Townsplots West (known locally as Enagh Beg), which contains a number of ancient forts.

History

Ecclesiastical history 

The Roman Catholic Diocese of Killala (Alladenis in Latin) is one of the five suffragan sees of the ecclesiastical Province of Tuam, comprising the north-western part of the County Mayo with the Barony of Tireragh in the County Sligo. In all there are 22 parishes, some of which, bordering on the Atlantic Ocean, consist mostly of wild moorland, sparsely inhabited.

The foundation of the diocese dates from the time of Saint Patrick, who placed his disciple St. Muredach over the church called in Irish Cell Alaid. In a well that still flows close to the town, beside the sea, local legend tells that Patrick baptized in a single day 12,000 converts, and on the same occasion, in presence of the crowds, raised to life a dead woman whom he also baptized. Muredach is described as an old man of Patrick's family, and was appointed to the Church of Killala as early as 442 or 443. His feast-day is on 12 August. It is probable that he resigned his see after a few years, and retired to end his life on the lonely island in Donegal Bay which has ever since borne his name, Inishmurray. At Killala Patrick baptized the two maidens whom he met in childhood at Focluth Wood by the western sea, and whose voices in visions of the night had often pathetically called him to come once more and dwell amongst them. He came, baptized them and built them a church where they spent the rest of their days as holy nuns in the service of God.

Little is known of the successors of Muredach in Killala down to the twelfth century. Of the sainted Bishop Cellach, for example, we learn merely that he came of royal blood, flourished in the sixth century and was murdered at the instigation of his foster-brother. His name is mentioned in Irish martyrologies. The people of Killala recall that John MacHale, Archbishop of Tuam, was a child of their diocese. He was born at Tubbernavine on 6 March 1791; became Coadjutor Bishop of Killala in 1825, bishop in 1834, and later in the same year was transferred to Tuam. He died on 7 November 1881, and is buried in the sanctuary of Tuam's cathedral. After him came Dr Finan, a Dominican priest unfit, owing to his continental training, to direct the affairs of an Irish diocese. On his resignation in 1838, a parish priest of the Archdiocese of Tuam, Rev. Thomas Feeney, who had formerly been professor and president of St. Jarlath's College at Tuam, was chosen for the task of repairing the injury that ecclesiastical discipline had suffered during his thirty-five year tenure.

Along the left bank of the river are the ruins of several monasteries. Rosserk, a Franciscan house of strict observance, was founded in 1460. The Abbey of Moyne still stands on a site just over the river, and further on, north of Killala, was the Dominican Rathfran Friary. On the promontory of Errew running into Lough Conn another monastery existed as such till comparatively recent times. A round tower in Killala itself, still preserved, indicated the ancient celebrity of the place as an ecclesiastical centre.

18th century 
By the end of the 18th century, Killala had established a small sea port, where fishing was the primary activity.  The town also produced coarse linens and woolen products.

French invasion 

Killala was the site of the first engagement which the French force of General Jean Joseph Amable Humbert that invaded Ireland to assist the Irish Rebellion of 1798 participated in. On 22 August 1798, Humbert landed at the nearby Kilcummin Harbor with 1,109 French troops with the objective of supporting the rebellion. Humbert's force quickly seized the town and advanced to Ballina, which his men also captured with little trouble. The force then moved further inland and on 27 August, it won a battle in Castlebar against a larger government force commanded by General Gerard Lake. The town was also the site of the last land engagement of the rebellion on 23 September 1798 when a government force led by Major-General Eyre Power Trench captured Killala.

Transport

Harbour
Killala has a harbour at the south end of Killala Bay.

Road
The R314 road connects Killala south to Ballina (and the N26 and N59 roads) and north to Ballycastle.

Bus Éireann route 445 serves Killala a few times a day on weekdays with service to Ballina and Ballycastle.

Railway
The line from Ballina to Killala opened on 2 January 1893. Two years and £29,000 it took to complete the line, carrying both passengers and freight the line had a total of five gatehouses, one tunnel and four bridges. At Killala station there was a turntable, two sidings, a signal cabin and a stationmaster's house-that is now privately owned. The line proved to be unprofitable and was discontinued for passengers on 1 October 1931 and finally for goods on 1 July 1934.

Industry 
Asahi manufactured acrylic fibre from acrylonitrile which was transported to Ballina railway station by rail from Dublin Port. The former Midland Great Western Railway line to Killala had been dismantled and built over prior to the factory's establishment south of the village in the 1970s so the remainder of the journey was completed by road. This facility closed in 1997. A proposal to handle asbestos waste at the Asahi site was withdrawn in 2005 due to strong local opposition.

A 50 MW combined heat and power plant using biomass fuel is planned for the former Asahi site, and a 20 MW wind farm has a 10 MW battery.

A transatlantic communications cable is expected to come ashore at Killala in 2013 en route to Northern Ireland as part of Project Kelvin.

Places of Interest 
The Round Tower – The last remaining medieval structure of a monastic establishment, thought to have been built in the 12th century. The monastery is traditionally said to have been founded here by Saint Patrick, who appointed St. Muiredach as the first bishop of Killala. The tower stands 52 metres (170 feet) high, and it is composed of limestone.

Cathedral Church of St. Patrick - Constructed in the 1670s, it is one of two Cathedral Churches belonging to the Church of Ireland's Diocese of Tuam, Limerick and Killaloe.

Culture 
Killala was used as the major location for the 1981 multi-million-pound television series The Year of the French (based on the novel by Thomas Flanagan).

In 1989 sculptor Carmel Gallagher unveiled a bust of General Humbert in the area to mark the then upcoming bicentennial of the 1798 Rebellion. In 1998 Killala celebrated the bicentenary of this event by twinning with the commune of Chauvé in France and Killala has established itself as a popular location for historians.

People
 Aileen Gilroy, Gaelic footballer, association footballer, Australian rules footballer 
 Patrick McHale, recipient of the Victoria Cross
 James Wills (1899-1949), first-class cricketer

See also 
 List of towns and villages in Ireland

Notes

References

External links 

 Community development in the west of Ireland: twenty years on in the Killala area. Community Development Journal 2007; 42: 330–347. Author: M.A. Brennan.
 Killala.ie – Official website for the Killala community.

Towns and villages in County Mayo